Veľká Čierna is a village and municipality in Žilina District in the Žilina Region of northern Slovakia.

History
In historical records the village was first mentioned in 1361.

Geography
The municipality lies at an altitude of 480 metres and covers an area of 4.817 km². It has a population of about 357 people.

External links
https://web.archive.org/web/20080111223415/http://www.statistics.sk/mosmis/eng/run.html 

Villages and municipalities in Žilina District